Muhammad Saqlain is an international field hockey player from Pakistan. He plays Centre half. He made his international debut in 1998.

Career

2006
He was part of the team which won the silver medal at the 2006 Commonwealth Games in Melbourne, Australia.

2008
Saqlain was part of the squad which placed 8th at the Beijing Olympics in 2008.

See also
Pakistan national field hockey team

References

External links
 

Living people
1978 births
Olympic field hockey players of Pakistan
Pakistani male field hockey players
Male field hockey midfielders
2002 Men's Hockey World Cup players
2006 Men's Hockey World Cup players
Field hockey players at the 2008 Summer Olympics
Field hockey players at the 2006 Commonwealth Games
Commonwealth Games silver medallists for Pakistan
Field hockey players at the 2002 Asian Games
Commonwealth Games bronze medallists for Pakistan
Field hockey players at the 2002 Commonwealth Games
Commonwealth Games medallists in field hockey
Asian Games competitors for Pakistan
Medallists at the 2002 Commonwealth Games
Medallists at the 2006 Commonwealth Games